The Medical Artists Association of Great Britain was founded on 2 April 1949 by British medical illustrators Dorothy Davison, Audrey Arnott and Margaret McLarty to act as a professional body for medical artists and to raise the standard of medical art through training, education and examinations.  Arnott acted as the association's first Secretary and the first Chairman was D.H. Tompsett, surgeon and later author of Anatomical Techniques, published in 1956.

The association started out as four departments in London, Manchester and Edinburgh and it took students or trainee/assistants during the 1940s and 1950s. By 1962 the association had started its own postgraduate programme to train graduate artists.  In 1989, forty years after its foundation, the association received the patronage of the Worshipful Company of Barbers, one of the City of London livery companies, and by the same year students were able to register at a medical school within London University to take a university diploma course.

A year later in 1990, the Association became a limited company continuing to train artists looking for a career in medical illustration.  In the 1996, the Association received the Charlotte Holt Bequest created by medical artist Charlotte Holt for the express purpose of training medical artists.  This led to the establishment of the Medical Artists' Education Trust (MAET), a charitable organisation tasked with managing the Association's specialist Postgraduate Training Programme.

Today, the Association is the professional body for Medical Artists in the UK with its members possessing specialist skills in art and a deep, if not professional, understanding of medical procedures specifically, but not exclusively, in the area of surgery.

References 

1949 establishments in the United Kingdom
Medical photography and illustration
Professional associations based in the United Kingdom